Ailey is a city in Montgomery County, Georgia, United States. As of the 2020 census, the city had a population of 519, up from 432 in 2010. It is part of the Vidalia Micropolitan Statistical Area.

History
A post office called Ailey was established in 1891. The town incorporated in 1893.

Geography
Ailey is located in western Montgomery County at  (32.187181, -82.568932). It is bordered to the west by Mount Vernon, the county seat. U.S. Route 280 passes through Ailey, leading west through Mount Vernon  to McRae–Helena and east  to Vidalia.

The city is drained by tributaries of the Oconee River.

Climate

Demographics

As of the census of 2000, there were 394 people, 165 households, and 111 families residing in the city. The racial makeup of the city was 60.66% White, 36.29% African American, 0.51% Asian, 0.25% Pacific Islander, 1.78% from other races, and 0.51% from two or more races. Hispanic or Latino of any race were 1.78% of the population.

There were 165 households, out of which 25.5% had children under the age of 18 living with them, 41.8% were married couples living together, 20.0% had a female householder with no husband present, and 32.7% were non-families. 27.9% of all households were made up of individuals, and 14.5% had someone living alone who was 65 years of age or older.  The average household size was 2.39 and the average family size was 2.90.

In the city, the population was spread out, with 25.6% under the age of 18, 7.6% from 18 to 24, 22.6% from 25 to 44, 26.9% from 45 to 64, and 17.3% who were 65 years of age or older.  The median age was 40 years. For every 100 females, there were 72.1 males.  For every 100 females age 18 and over, there were 74.4 males.

The median income for a household in the city was $36,125, and the median income for a family was $39,000. Males had a median income of $30,694 versus $30,000 for females. The per capita income for the city was $21,926.  About 19.8% of families and 22.1% of the population were below the poverty line, including 43.8% of those under age 18 and 20.0% of those age 65 or over.

Notable people
Hugh Peterson, lawyer
Sugar Ray Robinson, boxer

References

Cities in Georgia (U.S. state)
Cities in Montgomery County, Georgia
Vidalia, Georgia, micropolitan area